Jaume Sisa (born 1948 in El Poble-sec, Barcelona) is a Catalan singer-songwriter, who defines himself as 'Galactic', and whose greatist hit was Qualsevol nit pot sortir el sol from his eponymous album, released in 1975. Songs such as Nit de Sant Joan, El setè cel and L'home dibuixat are also well-known and remembered in the Catalan linguistic area. 

He is one of the main icons of the Catalan underground culture during the 70s and 80s, along with figures such as Pau Riba, Gato Pérez, or Jordi Batiste. Throughout his career he cultivated many and diverse musical styles such as progressive music, rock, folk, musical, copla and bolero. He influenced several subsequent generations of Catalan musicians.

He was part of Grup de Folk's collective, and also Música Dispersa and Orquestra Plateria groups. He also collaborated closely with Dagoll Dagom's theatre company.

Although he wrote most of his work in Catalan, he settled in Madrid during 10 years, where he adopted the heteronym Ricardo Solfa. During this time he published 4 records in Spanish.

Discography

With the group Música Dispersa

1971 - Música Dispersa

Under the name Jaume Sisa

1968 - L'home dibuixat (single)
1969 - Miniatura (EP with Pau Riba, El Cachas and Albert Batiste)
1971 – L'orgia
1975 – Qualsevol nit pot sortir el sol
1976 – Galeta galàctica
1977 – La catedral
1979 – La màgia de l'estudiant
1979 – Antaviana
1980 – Sisa i Melodrama
1981 – Nit de Sant Joan
1981 – Noche de San Juan
1982 – Barcelona postal
1983 – Roda la música
1984 – Transcantautor
1985 – Sisa (Compilation)
1994 – Sisa: "El més galàctic" (Compilation)
1996 – “El Viajante”, with Mestres, Llamado y Solfa (Disc-book)
2001 – Visca la llibertat (Drac/Virgin)
2002 – Bola voladora (Drac/Virgin)
2005 – Sisa al Zeleste 1975
2005 – El congrès dels solitaris
2006 – Sisa y Suburbano cantan a Vainica Doble
2008 – Ni cap ni peus (with Joan Miquel Oliver)

Under the name Ricardo Solfa

1987 – Carta a la novia
1989 – Cuando tú seas mayor
1992 – Ropa fina en las ruinas

References

External links
 

Musicians from Barcelona
Singers from Barcelona
Catalan-language singers
Singer-songwriters from Catalonia
1948 births
Living people
Música Global artists